Marjorie May Incledon (1891–1973) was  a British artist, notable as a painter and stained glass artist.

Biography
Incledon was born in Bromsgrove and educated at Berkhamsted Grammar School. She was a first cousin of J. R. R. Tolkien. From 1911 to 1914 she studied at the Birmingham School of Art and then, during 1917 and 1918 at the Central School of Art and Crafts in London. In 1941 Incledon returned to the Birmingham School of Art as a student for a year before studying at the Brighton College of Art until 1945. 

She remained based in Sussex throughout her life, living at Rottingdean and then at Ditchling, and producing paintings and stained glass designs of landscapes and still life subjects. Incledon exhibited works on a regular basis at the Royal Academy in London from 1945 to 1957, with the Society of Women Artists throughout the 1950s and also with the Royal Society of British Artists and the Royal Institute of Oil Painters. She was an elected member of the Sussex Women's Art Club and active in the Brighton United Artists group. Incledon died at Eastbourne in 1973.

References

Further reading
 Dictionary of British Artists Working 1900–1950 by Grant M. Waters, 1975, published by Eastbourne Fine Art

External links

Royal Academy of Arts: Exhibition catalogues mentioning Marjorie Incledon

1891 births
1973 deaths
20th-century English painters
20th-century English women artists
Alumni of the Birmingham School of Art
Alumni of the Central School of Art and Design
Alumni of the University of Brighton
English stained glass artists and manufacturers
English women painters
People from Bromsgrove